Filippo Sugar (born in 1971) is an Italian music publishing executive, and CEO of the family-owned publisher Sugar Music, which was founded by his grandfather Ladislao.

In 2015, Sugar was appointed president of the Italian performance rights society SIAE.

Filippo is the only child of Piero Sugar and Caterina Caselli, a key figure in talent scouting and record production in Italy.

Career
In 1997, at just 26 years old, Filippo became the Chief Executive Officer of the Sugar Group. 

In the 2000's, Filippo Sugar re-framed the company’s profile. First, expanding the two flagship Messaggerie Musicali stores in Milan and Rome and re-fashioning them into multimedia entertainment megastores. Secondly, launching Messaggerie Digitali, the first legal Italian platform for on-line music distribution. Thirdly, venturing into two innovative initiatives in local radio broadcasting: Radio Milano Uno and Radio Roma Uno.

In 2005, Sugar sold Radio Milano Uno and Radio Roma Uno to  LifeGate. In 2006, Sugar completed a deal to sell its two megastores to the Arnoldo Mondadori retail, retaining ownership of the real estate and the historic Messaggerie Musicali trademark, to focus on recording and music publishing with Sugar and Sugar 

Filippo has diversified Sugar’s portfolio of businesses through smart, strategic investments, and also by spearheading events in the performing arts space. In September 2011, Sugar spearheaded the Andrea Bocelli One Night in Central Park a historic concert event attended by over 70,000 people that yielded an album and television special.

In 2012, he acquired the esteemed CAM catalogue, a legendary Roman publishing company and world leader in the specialist cinema/soundtrack market.

In 2015, he developed the international format for Orchestras with La Dolce Vita: The Music of Italian Cinema which saw its worldwide premiere featuring The New York Philharmonic. And just recently, Filippo produced one of the most talked-about musical events of 2020 with Andrea Bocelli’s Music for Hope solo special which aired exclusively on YouTube Easter Sunday breaking records all over the world.

Filippo has led Sugar through a number of signings across a panoramic roster that includes Andrea Bocelli, Negramaro, Malika Ayane, Raphael Gualazzi, Motta including some of the most promising developing, Italian artists. These include Madame, Speranza, Micheal Leonardi, Lucio Corsi, Sissi, NYV, Fuera, NDG and Kety Fusco. 

Concurrently, Filippo continues to grow Sugar’s Publishing stable includes Giuliano Sangiorgi, Salmo, Willie Peyote, Mannarino, Stabber, Ketama126, as well as music publishing deals with Tiziano Ferro and Cesare Cremonini.

SIAE 

Since 2003, Filippo Sugar has proudly represented the Sugar Group companies within the SIAE organization (the Italian Collection Society for Authors & Publishers). Filippo rose to Chairman in 2015 leading efforts to create a society with the 100% membership basis controls by authors and publishers and re-launching SIAE through improved optimization and efficiencies by providing further rigor around process and transparency coupled with technological innovation. These directives consolidated copyright laws at both the domestic and European level, in the process, making SIAE competitive with other collection agencies.

During his tenure with SIAE, Filippo also dedicated time to nurturing emerging talent through a variety of special projects, achieving important results, not only in terms of business, but also in simplifying systems and procedures for authors, artists and all music users which included Italia Creativa, a study conducted by Ernst & Young, that provides a picture of the economy of cultural and Creative Industry as driving factors of economic growth and development.

He is also an active board member with SIAE, FEM (the Italian Federation of Music Publishers), PMI (the Italian Association of Independent Music Producers) and IMPF (the Independent Music Publishers Forum).

References

 “Filippo Sugar named chairman of Italian collection society SIAE” on MusicBusinessWorldWide
 “UMG Partners with Italy’s Sugar Music for global distribution” on MusicBusinessWorldWide
 “Ennio Morricone’s First Posthumous Album With 7 Unreleased Tracks Set for Release” on Variety
 “Behind Andrea Bocelli's Easter Concert in a Locked-Down Italy: It Is a Strong Message of Hope” on Billboard
 “BWW Interviews: Filippo Sugar and Renee Fleming Talk LA DOLCE VITA: THE MUSIC OF ITALIAN CINEMA” on BroadWayWorld
 “The World's Most Beloved Tenor Andrea Bocelli Gifts New York City With a Once in a Lifetime Musical Event” on PRNewsWire

Italian chief executives
Living people
Year of birth missing (living people)